The 76th Airlift Division (76th AD) is an inactive United States Air Force organization.  Its last assignment was with Military Airlift Command, assigned to Twenty-First Air Force, being stationed at Andrews Air Force Base, Maryland.  It was inactivated on 1 October 1985.

History

Lineage
 Established as 76 Air Division on 17 February 1976
 Activated on 1 March 1976
 Inactivated on 30 September 1977
 Activated on 15 December 1980
 Inactivated on 1 October 1985.

Assignments
 Military Airlift Command
 Twenty-First Air Force, 1 March 1976 – 30 September 1977
 Twenty-First Air Force, 15 December 1980 – 1 October 1985.

Stations
 Andrews AFB, Maryland, 1 March 1976 – 30 September 1977; 15 December 1980 – 1 October 1985.

Components
 89th Military Airlift Wing: 1 July 1976 – 30 September 1977; 15 December 1980 – 1 October 1985.

Operational history
In 1976 1977, and after 1980, the 76th provided airlift support for the President, Vice President, cabinet members, and other high ranking civilian and military dignitaries of the United States and other governments. Subordinate units also operated, administered and maintained Andrews AFB, Maryland, and provided logistical support for the National Emergency Airborne Command Post (NEACP), and other flying units. One component, the 1st Helicopter Squadron, provided support for the Department of Defense (DOD), and the Defense Preparedness Agency plan for emergency evacuation of key government officials and to support the national search and rescue plan.

See also
 List of United States Air Force air divisions

References

076